Alice's Restaurant is the debut studio album by Arlo Guthrie released in October 1967 by Reprise Records. It features one of his most famous songs, "Alice's Restaurant Massacree". A steady seller, the album peaked at No. 17 on the Billboard 200 album chart in March 1968. The album re-entered the chart in October 1969 and reached No. 63 in November of that year. Alice's Restaurant went gold (500,000 units sold) in September 1969 and Platinum (1,000,000 sold) in October 1986.

In 1996, Guthrie recorded the same material live for the album Alice's Restaurant: The Massacree Revisited.

Track listing
All tracks composed by Arlo Guthrie.

Side one
 "Alice's Restaurant Massacree" – 18:20

Side two
"Chilling of the Evening" – 3:01
 "Ring-Around-a-Rosy Rag" – 2:10
 "Now and Then" – 2:15
 "I'm Going Home" – 3:12
 "The Motorcycle Song" – 2:58
 "Highway in the Wind" – 2:40

Personnel
Arlo Guthrie – vocals, guitar
The unknown musicians who play the electric guitar, standup bass, and drums
Al Brown – assistant production
Richard Chalfin – cover concept
Diana J. Davies – photography
Fred Hellerman – production
Harold Leventhal – liner notes
Ed Thrasher – art direction
Sherman Weisburd – cover photography
John S. Wilson – liner notes

References

External links

1967 debut albums
Albums produced by Fred Hellerman
Arlo Guthrie albums
Reprise Records albums